Corfinio Cathedral is a Roman Catholic cathedral in Corfinio, Abruzzo, Italy, dedicated to Saint Pelinus. It was formerly the episcopal seat of the Diocese of Valva (Valva was a former name of Corfinio) and is now a co-cathedral in the Diocese of Sulmona-Valva.

See also
Catholic Church in Italy

Notes

Corfinio
Roman Catholic cathedrals in Italy
Corfinio
Romanesque architecture in Abruzzo